Myrmecophobia is the inexplicable fear of ants. It is a type of specific phobia. It is common for those who suffer from myrmecophobia to also have a wider fear of insects in general, as well as spiders (see Arachnophobia). Such a condition is known as entomophobia. This fear can manifest itself in several ways, such as a fear of ants contaminating a person's food supply, or fear of a home invasion by large numbers of ants.

In 2019, an Israeli study from Ariel University and Bar-Ilan University suggested that exposure to short clips from the Ant-Man movies could help to reduce an individual's phobia.

See also
Entomophobia
Fear of bees
Zoophobia

References

Zoophobias
Ants